is a Japanese actress, model, and former singer. From 2005 to 2017, she was a member of idol group AKB48 under Team A.

Career 
Kojima was born in Urawa-ku, Saitama, Saitama Prefecture, and started her career as a member of Angel Eyes, an idol group. After Angel Eyes disbanded in 2001, she remained in contract with Stardust, but later switched to Ogi Production.

Kojima participated in the first AKB48 audition in July 2005, which she passed along with 23 other participants, because the application was just taking a self-image by a mobile phone and e-mail it, and assuming that she "could take 10-time prettier one, and just sent". Although she voluntarily applied for the audition and passed, she was still looking at then-AKB48 project in a suspicious way, and tried to skip the very first dancing lesson because of her then-part-time job, but eventually participated it in response to the persuasion by Tomonobu Togasaki, Manager of AKB48 Theater.

The group made their debut in December of the same year, and Kojima was assigned as one of the 20 members of Team A; the number later dropped down to 16 but Kojima remained as a member.

In the past few years, she had made several appearances on television with the group, and is the only member to participate on all A-sides of the group's singles (except Eien Pressure) since the beginning of AKB48, making her one of the most visible figures in the group.

Kojima made her first appearance on Kohaku Uta Gassen, an annual music show where the most successful artists of the year are invited, with AKB48 on December 31, 2007.

Since 2007, Kojima has been actively exploring a possible acting career, and has made several appearances in a number of dramas and movies. Her first lead role came in the drama , which was filmed and aired in early 2008. Additionally, Kojima made her first appearance on the silver screen in the horror movie , along with several fellow AKB48 members. The group has also made brief appearance at the beginning of the movie in a live performance.

She was transferred from Team A to become a member of Team B during reshuffling of teams at the Tokyo Dome Concert held on August 24, 2012.

On September 18, 2013, AKB48 announced Kojima to be the center of the group's 33rd single, "Heart Electric".

In 2015, she and Yuki Kashiwagi were the center performers for the AKB48 single "Green Flash".

In AKB48's general election for 2016, under the name , Kojima finished 16th with 40,071 votes. During the results event on June 18, 2016, she announced that she would be leaving from the group. She said that she had thought about doing it two years ago, but the timing wasn't right especially given the handshake incident in 2014. She said that she was 28 and wanted to take the next step to become an adult woman. In 2017, she was announced as the center performer for AKB48's 47th single "Shoot Sign", released in March 2017. It marked her first center performance since "Green Flash" two years ago, and her third center performance on an AKB48 single overall. After her graduation concert  on February 21–22, 2017, she performed at the AKB48 theatre for the last time, on her birthday, on April 19, 2017.

Filmography

Movies

Dramas

Discography

Singles with AKB48

no3b

Awards 
 15th Nikkan Sports Drama Grand Prix (Jul–Sept 2011): Best Supporting Actress for Ikemen desu ne

References

External links 

  
  

1988 births
Living people
People from Saitama (city)
Japanese female idols
Japanese television personalities
Japanese female models
Japanese YouTubers
AKB48 members
Sony Music Entertainment Japan artists
Former Stardust Promotion artists
Musicians from Saitama Prefecture
21st-century Japanese women singers
21st-century Japanese singers
21st-century Japanese actresses